Kazangan may refer to:
 Kazangan-e Olya
 Kazangan-e Sofla